Mushabbar may refer to:

Mushabbar, third son of Harun (Aaron in the Bible)
Al Muhsin, third son of Ali and Fatima, also known as Mushabbar